"Electric scooter harley", "electric harley scooter" or simply "e-scooter harley" / "e-harley scooter", or sometimes called "fat-tire electric scooter", are the unofficial, not yet well-established terms, for a 2-wheel 1-person (or at very maximum, a 2-person) light electric vehicle, also known as personal mobility device, that's maximum speed is usually 25 kilometers per hour (sometimes however they have speed limit around 50 km) and that is rideable by sitting rather than standing.

Gallery

See also
Electric bicycle
Electric kick scooter
Electric skateboard
Electric unicycle
Electric onewheel

References

Electric vehicles
Personal transporters